Nicholas Berkeley Mason  (born 27 January 1944) is an English drummer and a founder member  of the progressive rock band Pink Floyd. He has been the only constant member since the band's formation in 1964, and is the only member to appear on every Pink Floyd album. He co-wrote Pink Floyd compositions including "Echoes", "Time", "Careful with That Axe, Eugene", and "One of These Days". In 2018, he formed a new band, Nick Mason's Saucerful of Secrets, to perform music from Pink Floyd's early years. He was inducted into the Rock and Roll Hall of Fame in 1996 as a member of Pink Floyd.

Early life
Mason was born on 27 January 1944 in Birmingham to Ailsa Sarah (née Kershaw) and Bill Mason, a documentary filmmaker;  Nick's paternal great-grandfather was Rowland Hill Berkeley, who was Lord Mayor of Birmingham in 1904–1905.

Mason was brought up in Hampstead, London, and attended the Hall School, Hampstead, and Frensham Heights School, near Farnham, Surrey. While studying architecture at the Regent Street Polytechnic (now the University of Westminster), he formed a band, Sigma 6, an early incarnation of Pink Floyd, with Roger Waters, Bob Klose and Richard Wright in 1964. In September 1963, Waters and Mason moved into a flat near Crouch End in London, owned by Mike Leonard, a part-time tutor at the nearby Hornsey College of Art and the Regent Street Polytechnic. Mason moved out after the 1964 academic year.

Pink Floyd
Pink Floyd released their debut album, The Piper at the Gates of Dawn, in 1967. Mason has played on every Pink Floyd album since. The only Pink Floyd compositions credited solely to Mason are "The Grand Vizier's Garden Party Parts 1–3" (from Ummagumma) and "Speak to Me" (from The Dark Side of the Moon). The track "Nick's Boogie" was named after him.

The only times Mason's voice has been included on Pink Floyd's albums are "Corporal Clegg", the single spoken line in "One of These Days" and spoken parts of "Signs of Life" and "Learning to Fly" (the latter taken from an actual recording of Mason's first solo flight) from A Momentary Lapse of Reason. He does, however, sing lead vocals on two unreleased but heavily bootlegged tracks, "Scream Thy Last Scream" (1967), penned by original leader Syd Barrett and "The Merry Xmas Song" (1975–76). In live performances of the song "Sheep", he did the spoken section.

Despite legal conflicts over ownership of the name "Pink Floyd", which began when Waters left the group in 1985 and lasted roughly seven years, Waters and Mason are reportedly on good terms. Mason joined Waters on the last two nights of his 2002 world tour to play drums on the Pink Floyd song "Set the Controls for the Heart of the Sun", and he also played drums on some concerts of Waters' European tour in 2006, and during performances in Los Angeles and New York City in the United States.

In July 2005, Mason, Gilmour, Wright, and Waters played together on stage for the first time in 24 years at the Live 8 concert in London. Mason joined Gilmour and Wright again for the encore during Gilmour's show at the Royal Albert Hall, London, on 31 May 2006. Mason has claimed to be the link between Gilmour and Waters. He also stated in 2006 that Pink Floyd had not officially disbanded, but with the death of Wright in 2008, the band effectively came to an end, as confirmed by Gilmour. In spite of this, Mason has continued to join Waters onstage on occasion. On 12 May 2007, Mason joined Waters on stage at Earls Court to play The Dark Side of the Moon. Again, on 12 May 2011, Mason was featured (along with Gilmour) on the encore "Outside the Wall" at a concert by Waters, who was performing The Wall in its entirety (Gilmour also performed on "Comfortably Numb" that night). While on the "Nick Mason's Saucerful Of Secrets" 2019 tour of the United States, Waters joined Mason on stage in New York City for the 18 April performance and performed "Set the Controls for the Heart of the Sun" while also humorously denying Mason an opportunity to bang the gong behind his drum kit, something Mason has frequently mentioned he had always wanted to do.

Unlike the other members of Pink Floyd, Mason has rarely played an instrument other than his drum kit or large array of percussion instruments, although he used tapes and contributed sound effects to many Pink Floyd albums. He has only played non-percussive instruments on "The Grand Vizier's Garden Party", his personal composition from Ummagumma, where he used a mellotron to play brief melodies and create ambient noises, on "Jugband Blues", where he played kazoo, and on live versions of "Outside the Wall", where he played acoustic guitar along with the rest of the band. However, on the Profiles album Mason released with Rick Fenn (from 10cc) in 1985, he is also credited with keyboards. He can be seen playing a vibraphone in the promo video for "Lie for a Lie", but it is unknown if he actually played on the recording. Mason has also said that he took some failed piano and violin lessons as a child before taking up drums.

Mason has worked with other musicians, including a drummer and producer for Steve Hillage, Robert Wyatt (with whom he appeared on Top of the Pops), the Damned and Gong. He also drummed for Michael Mantler.

Mason's book, Inside Out: A Personal History of Pink Floyd, was published in the UK in October 2004. It is also available, abridged, as a 3-CD audio book, read by Mason. An updated edition was published in paperback in 2011.

He performed in the closing ceremony of the 2012 Olympic Games on 12 August 2012. He produced and played on the charity single "Save the Children (Look Into Your Heart)", which also featured Beverley Knight, Mick Jagger and Ronnie Wood and which was released in May 2015 in aid of Save the Children's Nepal Earthquake Appeal.

On 17 October 2012, Mason was presented with a BASCA Gold Badge Award in recognition of his contributions to music.

Nick Mason's Saucerful of Secrets

In 2018, Mason formed a new band, Nick Mason's Saucerful of Secrets, to perform Pink Floyd's early psychedelic material. Along with Mason, the band comprises former Blockheads guitarist Lee Harris, bassist and Pink Floyd collaborator Guy Pratt, vocalist and guitarist Gary Kemp of Spandau Ballet, and Orb keyboardist Dom Beken. As many fans had discovered Pink Floyd with  The Dark Side of the Moon, Mason wanted to bring their earlier material to a wider audience. The band toured Europe and North America in 2018 and 2019, with a third tour postponed to 2021 due to the COVID-19 pandemic. In September 2020, they released a live album and film, Live at the Roundhouse.

Drumming style

Influenced by jazz and big band music, Mason embraced acoustic drums (both single- and double-headed), tuned percussion, electronic drums and Rototoms, melding all of these into a melodic whole. His snare drum sound shifted from harsh demarcation of beats 2 and 4 ("Careful with that Axe, Eugene") to a fatter and gentler timbre ("Echoes") — a change that reflected growing studio skills.
His style was gentler and more laid back than that of other progressive rock drummers of the time. Mason soloed on a few Pink Floyd compositions including "Nick's Boogie", "A Saucerful of Secrets", "The Grand Vizier's Garden Party", "Up The Khyber", "Skins", and "Time". Due to the dynamic live performances of Pink Floyd, Mason's style was more energetic and complex live, and can be heard on such albums as Ummagumma and Live at Pompeii.

He used Premier drums in the 1960s and occasionally in the 1970s. After that, he used Ludwig drums from 1970 until 1992. He currently uses Drum Workshop (DW) drums, pedals and hardware. His kit is a DW double bass kit with the Dark Side of the Moon logo on the drums. He has also used Paiste cymbals during his entire career with Pink Floyd and currently uses a mixture of Paiste Traditional, Signature and 2002 cymbals. He also endorses Remo drumheads, Latin Percussion and Pro-Mark sticks.

Cars and motor racing

As Pink Floyd's recording and touring schedule grew more sporadic, Mason was left with more time to pursue his favourite hobby, motor racing. This interest was documented in the 1986 short film Life Could Be a Dream. He owns (through his company Ten Tenths) and races several classic cars, and has competed successfully at the 24 Hours of Le Mans. His racing cars include: Alfa Romeo 8C; Bentley 4½ Litre (his father's racing car); Bugatti Type 35; Jaguar D-Type; Ferrari 250 LM; Ferrari BB LM; Maserati Tipo 61; McLaren F1 GTR; and he previously raced a BRM P30.

In 1998, Mason published a book, Into the Red, in which he documents his experience with his cars, along with some histories. It was followed in 2010 by a second book, Passion for Speed: Twenty-four Classic Cars that Shaped a Century of Motor Sport.

Mason is associated with the Italian manufacturer Ferrari, and estimates he has owned 40 Ferrari cars. His first purchase in the early 1970s was a Ferrari 275 GTB/4, which he comments would regularly wet-plug (when spark plugs are coated with unburned fuel). His most notable purchase was in 1977 from his proceeds from the sale of the Pink Floyd album Dark Side Of The Moon, when he paid £37,000 for one of only 39 Ferrari 250 GTOs – he still owns the car, valued now in excess of £30 million. Mason and Gilmour drove the first two Ferrari F40s back to the UK from Maranello.

Mason was invited by Ferrari to purchase one of the 400 Enzo models (now sold replaced by a Blu Scozia-coloured LaFerrari), which he let Jeremy Clarkson borrow for reviewing purposes on an episode of the BBC motoring programme Top Gear. Mason agreed, on the sole condition that throughout the review, Clarkson promoted the release of the book Inside Out: A Personal History of Pink Floyd. This led to Clarkson using Pink Floyd album titles in his description of the Enzo and the Stig driving round the track with "Another Brick in the Wall" playing (despite the fact that the Enzo does not come equipped with a stereo).

Mason appeared on Season 2, Episode 8 of The Grand Tour. He competed and won against Stewart Copeland for the title of "fastest rock drummer from a band that begins with a P" (driving not drumming) in the show's Celebrity Face Off segment.

24 Hours of Le Mans results

Personal life
Mason's first marriage (1969) was to Lindy Rutter, with whom he had two daughters, Chloe and Holly. Lindy was an accomplished woodwind player; she played flute on "The Grand Vizier's Garden Party" from Ummagumma. The couple divorced in the late 1980s and Mason is now married to his second wife Annette Lynton (Nettie), an actress also known for her adjudication role on the second series of Treasure Hunt in 1984. They have two sons, Cary and Guy, and live in Hampstead, London. Since 1995 they have also owned Middlewick House, the Grade II listed former home of Andrew and Camilla Parker Bowles, just outside the Wiltshire town of Corsham.

His wealth amounted to £75 million, according to the Sunday Times Rich List 2015–2016. He is a qualified pilot, and flies an Aerospatiale AS 350 Squirrel helicopter in specially painted colours.

Mason is part of Football Ventures, a consortium that bought Bolton Wanderers Football Club out of administration in August 2019. He is a supporter of Arsenal F.C.

Mason's portrait was painted by semi-finalists in a December 2021 episode of Portrait Artist of the Year.

Views and advocacy
In common with Roger Waters, Mason has played concerts to raise funds for the Countryside Alliance, a group which campaigned against the ban on fox hunting with the Hunting Act 2004. In 2007 they both performed at Highclere Castle in Hampshire in support of the group.

He is a board member and co-chairman of the Featured Artists' Coalition. As a spokesman for the organisation, Mason has voiced his support for musicians' rights and offered advice to younger artists in a rapidly changing music industry.

Mason has joined Roger Waters in expressing support for the Boycott, Divestment and Sanctions campaign against Israel over the Israeli–Palestinian conflict and urged the Rolling Stones not to play in Israel in 2014.

Mason is an atheist.

Honours and awards
On 26 November 2012, Mason received the Honorary title of Doctor of Letters from the University of Westminster at the presentation ceremony of the School of Architecture and Built Environment (he had studied architecture at the university's predecessor, Regent Street Polytechnic, 1962–1967).

Mason was appointed a Commander of the Order of the British Empire (CBE) in the 2019 New Year Honours, "for services to music", and was presented with the award by Prince William, Duke of Cambridge at Buckingham Palace on 2 May 2019.

Discography

With Pink Floyd

Solo albums
 Nick Mason's Fictitious Sports – 3 May 1981

Nick Mason's Saucerful of Secrets
 2020 : Live at the Roundhouse

Box set
 Unattended Luggage – 31 August 2018 (No. 94 UK Albums Chart)

With Rick Fenn
 Profiles – 29 July 1985
 Life Could Be a Dream – 1986 (soundtrack)
 White of the Eye – 1 January 1987 (soundtrack)
 Body Contact – 1987 (soundtrack)
 Tank Malling – 1988 (soundtrack)

With Michael Mantler
 The Hapless Child – 1976
 Something There – 1982
 Live – 1987
 Review – 2000
 Concertos – 2008

As a producer
 Screw – Banks of the River / Devil's Hour (1969), a 10" single, rel. on Shagrat Recs.
 Chimera – Chimera (1969/70; re-released 2002), w/ Rick Wright and Bob Weston collaborating
 Principal Edwards Magic Theatre – The Asmoto Running Band (1971)
 Principal Edwards Magic Theatre – Round One (1974)
 Robert Wyatt – Rock Bottom (1974)
 The associated non-album single, "I'm a Believer"; Mason was a member of Wyatt's backing band when he performed the song on Top of the Pops
 Gong – Shamal (1976)
 The Damned – Music for Pleasure (1977)
 Steve Hillage – Green (1978); co-produced w/ Steve Hillage. Mason also plays drums on "Leylines to Glassdom"

Collaboration
 2008 : Robert Wyatt & Friends – Theatre Royal Drury Lane 8th September 1974 – With Hugh Hopper, Mike Oldfield, Dave Stewart, Fred Frith, Julie Tippetts, Ivor Cutler, etc.

Books
 At the Limit: 21 Classic Race Cars That Shaped a Century of Motorsport (with Mark Hales): Motorbooks International (1998) 
 Into the Red: 22 Classic Cars That Shaped a Century of Motor Sport (with Mark Hales) – 3 September 1998 (first edition), 9 September 2004 (second edition)
 Inside Out: A Personal History of Pink Floyd – 28 October 2004
 Passion for Speed: Twenty-Four Classic Cars that Shaped a Century of Motor Sport (with Mark Hales): Carlton Books (2010)

References

Sources
 
 
 
 
 Robert Wyatt & Friends* – Theatre Royal Drury Lane 8 September 1974 : Robert Wyatt & Friends* - Theatre Royal Drury Lane 8th September 1974
 Nick Mason's Saucerful Of Secrets – Live At The Roundhouse : https://www.discogs.com/fr/Nick-Masons-Saucerful-Of-Secrets-Live-At-The-Roundhouse/release/15927877

External links

 
1944 births
Living people
Commanders of the Order of the British Empire
People from Edgbaston
People educated at Frensham Heights School
People educated at The Hall School, Hampstead
Alumni of the Regent Street Polytechnic
British male drummers
English rock drummers
English composers
English autobiographers
English songwriters
Pink Floyd members
Progressive rock drummers
English record producers
24 Hours of Le Mans drivers
World Sportscar Championship drivers
Harvest Records artists
English atheists
British car collectors
Musicians from Birmingham, West Midlands
Musicians from London
Porsche Motorsports drivers